Fargo was a brand of trucks originally produced in the United States in 1913 by the Fargo Motor Car Company. Dropped in 1922, the name was reintroduced for a line of trucks manufactured by the Chrysler Corporation after purchasing Fargo Motors in 1928. Later, Chrysler absorbed Dodge and started producing its truck line, so over time, Fargo trucks became rebadged Dodges, similar to the parallel sale by General Motors of its GMC and Chevrolet truck lines.

The modern-day descendant of Chrysler's truck division is now known as Ram Trucks.

History

The first Fargo trucks were built in Pilsen, Chicago, by the Fargo Motor Car Company from 1913 until 1922.  In 1928, Chrysler bought the business and created their own line of Fargo trucks.  Shortly after its creation, Chrysler also bought the Dodge Brothers Company, adding Dodge- and Graham Brothers-badged trucks to its product line. From then on, Fargo trucks were almost identical to Dodge models, save for trim and name, and were sold by Chrysler-Plymouth dealers.

U.S. sales of Fargo trucks were discontinued in the 1930s and replaced in the US by Plymouth-badged trucks in 1937, In Canada, the name Fargo was used until 1972 for marketing reasons to differentiate the trucks as Chrysler-Plymouth dealer offerings apart from the Dodge trucks sold at Dodge dealers.

Chrysler's badge engineering
The Fargo brand lived longer in a variety of countries under the Chrysler Corporation's badge engineering marketing approach.

Manufactured in Detroit at the Lynch Road facility, Dodge trucks were also offered under the Fargo (or De Soto) names in most of Latin America, while in Europe and Asia, they were mainly built in Chrysler's Kew (UK) plant and sold under either the Fargo or DeSoto badge names.

In Argentina, the make Fargo was used for the pick up D-100 and the D-400, and DP-400 diesel truck from 1960 to 1967.

In Australia, both American and British Dodge models, along with locally assembled units, were marketed by Chrysler Australia with Dodge, Fargo, or De Soto badges.

Additionally, heavy trucks made in Spain by Barreiros, Chrysler's Spanish subsidiary, including a 38-tonne tractor and rigid four-, six- and eight-wheelers, which were sold in the UK as the Dodge 300 Series, were exported to several countries as Fargo vehicles.

Use of the Fargo trademark came to an end in the US when Dodge pulled out of the American heavy truck business in 1976, and finally in 1978, when Chrysler Europe was sold to PSA Peugeot Citroën.

In Turkey
The Fargo brand existed in Turkey for years, and well into the 21st century, because Fargo and De Soto light and heavy trucks were made by Turkish manufacturer Askam, with no technical or business connection with Chrysler in its final years.  However, Askam was the descendant of Chrysler Kamyon Montaj Fabrikası, founded in Istanbul in 1964. Askam went out of business in 2015, meaning that the LDV Maxus van was the last Fargo-badged (as the "Fargo Fora") vehicle offered in the world.

See also
 Dodge A100, which was marketed in Canada as a Fargo
 DeSoto (automobile)#DeSoto trucks, a rebadging of the Fargo trucks
Dodge Ram

References

External links

Fargo trucks, a brief history
Oz gallery
Australian Vehicles, Misc.

Motor vehicle manufacturers of the United States
Motor vehicles manufactured in Turkey
Truck manufacturers of Canada
Chrysler
Truck manufacturers of the United Kingdom
Truck manufacturers of the United States
Truck manufacturers of Turkey
Motor vehicle manufacturers of England